Mohammed Bassas (born 31 August 1998) is a Saudi Arabian footballer who plays as a centre-back for Ohod.

Career
Bassas began his career at the youth team of Al-Ahli. He was promoted to the first team in 2018. On 4 February 2019, Bassas joined Al-Taawoun on loan from Al-Ahli. On 8 July 2021, Bassas joined Al-Hazem on loan. After making just one appearance for the club, the loan was cut short. On 13 January 2022, Bassas joined Ohod on loan until the end of the season. On 25 July 2022, Bassas joined Ohod on a permanent deal.

Career statistics

Club

Honours
Al-Taawoun
King Cup: 2019

References

External links
 

1998 births
Living people
Saudi Arabian footballers
Association football defenders
Saudi Professional League players
Saudi First Division League players
Al-Ahli Saudi FC players
Al-Taawoun FC players
Al-Hazem F.C. players
Ohod Club players
Saudi Arabia youth international footballers
Sportspeople from Jeddah